This is a complete list of the songs known to have been written or co-written by Jimmy Jam and Terry Lewis.

See also: List of songs produced by Jimmy Jam & Terry Lewis 
Jimmy Jam and Terry Lewis